David Murray (born 1970 in Cork) is an Irish actor who has portrayed both minor and major characters in Irish film and television. Some of his best known roles include his portrayal of Brian Lenihan Jnr in The Guarantee and Ben Bailey in the Irish television series Amber. Additionally he has had small roles in major productions such as King Arthur, Batman Begins and G.I. Joe: The Rise of Cobra. In 2010, he starred in a television commercial for the opening of Dublin Airport's new terminal building.

Filmography

Film
 The Sun, the Moon and the Stars (1996) - Danny
 Flick (2000) - Jack Flinter
 Veronica Guerin (2003) - Charles Bowden
 The Honeymooners (2003) - Ray
 Cowboys & Angels (2003) - Keith
 King Arthur (2004) - Merlin's Lieutenant
 Out of Season (2004) - Simeon Guant
 Batman Begins (2005) - Jumpy Thug
 Dorothy Mills (2008) - Tom O'Brien
 Zonad (2009) - Benson
 G.I. Joe: The Rise of Cobra (2009) - James McCullen (1641)
 Keys to the City (2012) - Declan
 King of the Travellers (2012) - Black Martin
 Davin (2014) - Philip
 The Guarantee (2014) - Brian Lenihan
 Traders (2015) - Kevin
 Johnny Gone Down (2016) - Ishmael, Abraham
 Lead Us Not (2016) - Dr. Alan Ryan

Television
 The Cassidys (2001) - Giles
 Little White Lie (2008) - Director
 Raw (2008) - Karl Creed
 Revolution (2009) - David Ash
 The Importance of Being Whatever (2011) - Mr. B
 Silent Witness (2013) - Alan Lane
 Jack Taylor: The Dramatist (2013) - Professor Doyle
 Vikings (2013) - Lord Aethelwulf
 Ripper Street (2013) - Ely
 Amber (2014) - Ben Bailey
 Quirke (2014) - John Millican
 White City (2015) - Colin Flanagan

References

External links

Irish male film actors
Irish male television actors
Living people
1970 births
Male actors from Cork (city)
21st-century Irish male actors